Integrated Publishing System is a system created in 1982 for publishing multilingual literature.

The software was developed by the Watchtower Bible and Tract Society on an IBM mainframe computer using an Autologic typesetter. IPS was acquired by IBM, which intended to use the system to increase its hold on the publishing industry.

The system went on to have some success commercially, being used to print the Encyclopædia Britannica.

References

History of software